The Ambassador Extraordinary and Plenipotentiary of Ukraine to Slovakia is the ambassador of Ukraine to Slovakia. The current ambassador is Yuriy Mushka. He assumed the position in November 2016.

The first Ukrainian ambassador to Slovakia assumed his post in 1992, the same year a Ukrainian embassy opened in Bratislava.

List of representatives
 1992–1993 Roman Lubkivsky
 1993–1995 Petro Sardachuk
 1995–1998 Dmytro Pavlychko
 1998–2004 Yuriy Rylach
 2004–2005 Serhiy Ustych
 2005–2010 Inna Ohnivets
 2010 Ivan Kholostenko (Charge d'Affairs)
 2010–2016 Oleh Havashi
 Since 2016 Yuriy Mushka

See also 
 Ukrainian Embassy, Bratislava
 Ambassador of Slovakia to Ukraine

References

External links 
  Embassy of Ukraine to Slovakia: Previous Ambassadors

 
Slovakia
Ukraine